Benzo[a]fluorene (IUPAC name, 11H-benzo[a]fluorene) is a polycyclic aromatic hydrocarbon (PAH). It is currently listed as a Group 3 carcinogen by the IARC.

See also
 Benzo[c]fluorene
 Benzofluorene

References 

IARC Group 3 carcinogens
Polycyclic aromatic hydrocarbons
Tetracyclic compounds